King-Flowers-Keaton House is a historic home located near Statesville, Iredell County, North Carolina.  The house was built about 1800, and is a two-story, five bay by two bay, transitional Georgian / Federal style frame dwelling.  It has a gable roof, rear ell, and two single shoulder brick end chimneys. Also on the property is a contributing outbuilding.

It was added to the National Register of Historic Places in 1980.

References

Houses on the National Register of Historic Places in North Carolina
Georgian architecture in North Carolina
Federal architecture in North Carolina
Houses completed in 1800
Houses in Iredell County, North Carolina
National Register of Historic Places in Iredell County, North Carolina